The white-footed saki, buffy saki or white saki (Pithecia albicans) is a species of saki monkey, a type of New World monkey, endemic to western Brazil south of the Amazon.

References

white-footed saki
Mammals of Brazil
Endemic fauna of Brazil
white-footed saki
white-footed saki